Theo Dorgan (born 1953) is an Irish poet, writer and lecturer, translator, librettist and documentary screenwriter. 
He lives in Dublin.

Life 
Dorgan was born in Cork in 1953 being the second child born into a family of 8 boys and 8 girls to parents Bertie and Rosemary Dorgan, and was educated in North Monastery School. He completed a BA in English and Philosophy and a MA in English at University College Cork, after which he tutored and lectured at that University, while simultaneously being Literature Officer with Triskel Arts Centre in Cork. He was visiting faculty at University of Southern Maine.

He lives in Dublin with his partner, the poet and playwright Paula Meehan.

Career 
After Theo Dorgan's first two collections, The Ordinary House of Love and Rosa Mundi, went out of print, Dedalus Press reissued these two titles in a single volume What This Earth Cost Us. He has also published selected poems in Italian, La Case ai Margini del Mundo, (Faenza, Moby Dick, 1999).

Dorgan has edited The Great Book of Ireland (with Gene Lambert, 1991); Revising the Rising (with Máirín Ní Dhonnachadha, 1991); Irish Poetry Since Kavanagh (Dublin, Four Courts Press, 1996); Watching the River Flow (with Noel Duffy, Dublin, Poetry Ireland/Éigse Éireann, 1999); The Great Book of Gaelic (with Malcolm Maclean, Edinburgh, Canongate, 2002); and The Book of Uncommon Prayer (Dublin, Penguin Ireland, 2007).

He has been the Series Editor of the European Poetry Translation Network publications and Director of the collective translation seminars from which the books arose.

A former Director of Poetry Ireland, Dorgan has worked as a broadcaster of literary programmes on both radio and television. He was the presenter of Poetry Now on RTÉ Radio 1, and later for RTÉ's TV books programme, Imprint. He was the scriptwriter for the TV documentary series Hidden Treasures. His Jason and the Argonauts, set to music by Howard Goodall, was commissioned by and premiered in the Royal Albert Hall in 2004.  A series of text pieces by Dorgan feature in the dance musical Riverdance; he was specially commissioned to create them for the theatrical show. His songs have been recorded by a number of musicians, including Alan Stivell, Jimmy Crowley and Cormac Breathnach.

Awards and recognition
Dorgan was awarded the Listowel Prize for Poetry in 1992 and the O'Shaughnessy Prize for Irish Poetry in 2010. A member of Aosdána, he was appointed as a member of the Arts Council from 2003 to 2008. He also served on the board of Cork European Capital of Culture 2005.

He was awarded the 2015 Poetry Now Award for Nine Bright Shiners.

Works

Poetry
 The ordinary house of love, Salmon Pub., 1990, 
 Rosa Mundi, Salmon poetry, 1995, 
 La casa ai margini del mondo., Translated by M. Giosa, Mobydick, 1998, 
 Sappho's Daughter, Wave Train Press, 1998, 
 La Hija de Safo, Translated by Francisco Castaño, Hiperión Ediciones, 2001, 
 What This Earth Cost Us, Dedalus Press, 2008, 
 Greek, Dedalus Press, 2010, 
 Making Way, New Island Books, 2013, 
 Nine Bright Shiners, Dedalus Press, 2014, 
 Orpheus, Dedalus Press, 2018, 
 Bailéid Giofógacha, Coiscéim, 2019

Non-fiction
 Sailing for home: a voyage from Antigua to Kinsale, Penguin Ireland, 2004; Penguin Ireland, 2005, ; Dedalus Press, 2010, 
 Time on the Ocean: A Voyage From Cape Horn to Cape Town, New Island Books, 2010, 
Editor
 
 Preghiere non-comuni, Armenia (1 January 2009)

Translations
 Songs of earth and light, Barbara Korun, Southword Editions, 2005,

References

Sources 
 William Stewart, Steven Barfield, British and Irish poets: a biographical dictionary, 449–2006, McFarland, 2007,

Further reading

External links 
 Official website for Theo Dorgan
 Entry for Theo Dorgan on the Aosdána web page
 Dedalus Press author page
 Poem by Theo Dorgan in Magma
 Nothing Rhymes, Broadsheet, 7 August 2012

1953 births
Irish poets
Living people
Aosdána members
Writers from Dublin (city)
20th-century Irish writers
20th-century male writers
21st-century Irish writers
21st-century Irish male writers
Alumni of University College Cork